Hortacarus is a genus of mites in the family Acaridae.

Species
 Hortacarus simplisetosus S. Mahunka, 1979

References

Acaridae